Daho Ould Kablia (دحو ولد قابلية) (born May 4, 1933) is the former Algerian interior minister (Ministre de l'Intérieur et des Collectivités Locales).

In the mid-to-late-2000s, he was the Algerian Minister-Delegate to the Minister of State for the Interior and Local Authorities, responsible for Local Authorities.

References

Interior ministers of Algeria
Living people
Place of birth missing (living people)
1933 births
21st-century Algerian people